NGC 4544 is an edge-on spiral galaxy located about 52 million light-years away in the constellation Virgo. NGC 4544 was discovered by astronomer Edward Swift on April 27, 1887. NGC 4544 is a member of the Virgo Cluster.

See also
 List of NGC objects (4001–5000)

References

External links
 
 

Virgo (constellation)
Spiral galaxies
4544
41958
7756
Astronomical objects discovered in 1887
Virgo Cluster
Discoveries by Edward Swift